Øksfjord is a village in Norway.

Øksfjord is visited by the coastal service Hurtigruten boat daily, stopping here between stops at Skjervøy and Hammerfest. Since most of Loppa municipality is inaccessible by car, Øksfjord is a major transportation hub with regular car ferry connections to the Nuvsvåg, Bergsfjord, and Sør-Tverrfjord areas. There is also a regular ferry connection from Øksfjord to the village of Hasvik on the neighboring island of Sørøya in Hasvik municipality.

History
On 12 April 1941, the Royal Norwegian Navy — exiled to the United Kingdom — moored the destroyer  at the pier at one o'clock in the night, with two objectives: To show the people of occupied Norway that the Navy was operating on the coast of Norway; and to blow up a fish oil factory. The warship departed after two hours, while inhabitants stood on the pier singing the national anthem.

Notable person
Hans E. Kinck (1865–1926), novelist, dramatist and essayist, was born and raised in Øksfjord.

Commerce
The village has one café and one pub, as of 2015.

Popular culture
Øksfjord is the setting of the 2009 film Dead Snow
Hallgeir Pedersen, jazz guitarist, lives in Øksfjord

Media gallery

Climate
Øksfjord's climate type is dominated by the winter season, a long, bitterly cold period with short, clear days, relatively little precipitation mostly in the form of snow, and low humidity. The Köppen Climate Classification subtype for this climate is "Dfc". (Continental Subarctic Climate).

References

Villages in Finnmark
Loppa
Populated places of Arctic Norway